XFX Inc. is a Chinese electronics company that specializes in the manufacturing of video cards, power supplies and motherboards. XFX has its headquarters in Ontario, California, and is a division of Hong Kong-based Pine Technology Holdings Limited.

Video cards

Originally, XFX produced only Nvidia graphics cards; in 2009, XFX switched to manufacturing ATI (now AMD) graphics cards. While it kept selling Nvidia mid-range cards for some time, it later ceased producing any GeForce graphics cards.

Warranty 
All XFX graphics cards sold in the US or Canada previously came with a "double-lifetime" warranty. This warranty gave lifetime coverage to the original buyer and, in addition, a subsequent owner of the used graphics card. However, it was only valid if the card was registered with XFX directly within 30 days of purchase. In January 2012, with the introduction of its Radeon HD 7970 graphics cards, XFX silently discontinued its famous "double-lifetime" warranties, stating it was not sustainable. The lifetime warranty is not available for Radeon R 300-series or greater.  It is only offered for the following models if they are registered within 30 days of purchase:
XFX Radeon R 200-Series Double Dissipation Edition and HD 7000 Series Double Dissipation Edition Graphics Cards.
XFX Radeon R-Series and HD 7000 Series Graphics Cards with 10-digit model numbers ending in "R" (example: "FX-797A-TDFR")
XFX Radeon HD 6000, HD 5000, and HD 4000 Series Graphics Cards
XFX GeForce GT 640, GT 630, 520, GT 430, 200, 9000, 8000, 7000, 6000 Series Graphics Cards purchased after April 17, 2007.

Overclocked cards
In addition to reference clocked graphic units, XFX also supplies overclocked graphic units that are similar to the ones produced by BFG, EVGA and ASUS. This is targeted at the enthusiast market, as well as those who may be unfamiliar with overclocking. These overclocked cards are often sold alongside cards with standard clocks at a slightly higher price. Overclocked systems are commonly designated with the names "Extreme Edition", "XXX Edition", "Black Edition" or "Alpha Dog Edition".

Fatal1ty video cards
In 2006, XFX made an agreement to use the name of a computer tournament game player, Johnathan "Fatal1ty" Wendel, on a division of graphics cards. However, the Fatal1ty branding has seemingly been dropped for unknown reasons.

Radeon cards
XFX produces many AMD Radeon cards from the R700 Series to the Evergreen series. From the R700 family, XFX only produced high-end and enthusiast-level graphics cards. From the Evergreen family, XFX produced cards from all levels; these cards include the HD5450, HD5550, HD5570, HD5650, HD5670, HD5770, HD5850, HD5870, and HD5970. High-end cards from both the R700 and Evergreen families are given the Black Edition designation. From the Barts family, XFX produced an AMD Radeon HD 6870 card. XFX has also produced, from the AMD Radeon HD 6 Series, the HD 6850, HD 6870, HD 6950 and HD 6970. 
With the release of "Southern Island" family of AMD GPUs, XFX manufactured a full range of 7XXX series cards (including the 7970 and 7990, the single and dual GPU flagship cards of the AMD 7000 series). XFX has kept up with the latest "Volcanic Islands" family, being among the first to retail an entire range of R-series cards.

Power supplies
XFX began selling power supplies in 2009, with their first unit being an 850w model under the branding "Black Edition". Since then, they have expanded their lineup to include a total of three brands: "Black Edition", "XXX Edition", and "Core Edition". XFX exclusively uses Seasonic topologies in their power supplies.

Television
XFX produced a low-budget infomercial called Extreme PC Garage, which was claimed to be the pilot for a television series. XFX took an obsolete model PC and attempted to upgrade it. However, in the infomercial the entire PC was actually replaced with a custom built ATX case and expensive XFX components, which is not an "upgrade". The program was intended to mock the concept of MTV's Pimp My Ride.

References

External links

 XFX official website

Graphics hardware companies
Ontario, California
Electronics companies of the United States